Elenowen is an American singer-songwriter/folk rock musical duo, composed of married couple Josh and Nicole Johnson. Elenowen released their debut album, Pulling Back The Veil. In 2011, the duo also appeared on the first season of NBC's The Voice. The duo followed up with a 5-song self-titled EP, released May 2012.

Biography

The duo released their first album, Pulling Back The Veil, in 2010. The tracks on Pulling Back The Veil are inspired by the couple's own relationship. "The first year of marriage had major ups and downs for us, and gave us a lot of inspiration to write", said Nicole.

Josh and Nicole began filming impromptu performances in their small basement apartment, with the resulting clips – called ‘The Basement Sessions’ – quickly garnering a following on YouTube and the No Depression website.

In 2011, Elenowen made their national television debut on the premiere season of NBC's The Voice. Elenowen followed up this success with a 5-song self-titled EP in 2012 (Dualtone Records). The couple teamed up with acclaimed songwriter Trent Dabbs and co-producer Phillip LaRue to help pen tracks for the EP. The single "Honey Come Home" also reached #1 on the iTunes Singer-songwriter charts.

Songs from Pulling Back The Veil were featured on popular TV programs "One Tree Hill", MTV's "World of Jenks",  Army Wives, and CW's Reign. "Run" (a single written with LaRue) was used in One Tree Hill season 9. Another single, "No Such Thing as Time", was featured in Pretty Little Liars season 3 and One Tree Hill season 9. "Bittersweet" (from the 2012 EP) was included on the first season of NBC's Reign. "The Place From Where I Fell" was featured in "You Me Her" season 1. "Hiding Place" was included in Global TV's "Private Eyes".

Elenowen released their third studio album "For the Taking" on January 20, 2015. "For the Taking" was the duo's first release with Ready. Set. Records! and was co-produced by Jeremy Bose and Trent Dabbs.

Discography

Albums

Singles

References

American folk rock groups
Folk rock duos
Married couples
The Voice (franchise) contestants